Vagula is a village in Võru Parish, Võru County in southern Estonia.

Gallery

See also
Lake Vagula

References

 

Villages in Võru County